Pristosia is a genus of ground beetles in the family Carabidae. There are more than 100 described species in Pristosia, found in southern and eastern Asia.

Species
These 101 species belong to Pristosia.

 Pristosia abaensis Lassalle, 2013  (China)
 Pristosia acalathusoides Lassalle, 2013  (China)
 Pristosia acraea (Andrewes, 1934)  (India)
 Pristosia aeneocuprea (Fairmaire, 1886)  (China)
 Pristosia aeneola (Bates, 1873)  (Japan)
 Pristosia aereipennis (Andrewes, 1934)  (India)
 Pristosia alesi (Jedlicka, 1937)  (China)
 Pristosia amaroides (Putzeys, 1877)  (Bhutan, India, and Nepal)
 Pristosia aquilo (Andrewes, 1934)  (India)
 Pristosia atrema (Andrewes, 1926)  (India)
 Pristosia bastai Lassalle, 2013  (China)
 Pristosia braccata (Andrewes, 1934)  (India)
 Pristosia brancuccii Deuve & Lassalle&Queinnec, 1985  (India)
 Pristosia bulirschi Lassalle, 2010  (China)
 Pristosia chambae (Andrewes, 1934)  (India)
 Pristosia championi (Andrewes, 1934)  (India)
 Pristosia chinensis (Jedlicka, 1933)  (China)
 Pristosia chlorodes (Andrewes, 1934)  (India and Myanmar)
 Pristosia clara (Andrewes, 1924)  (India)
 Pristosia colasi Lassalle, 2013  (China)
 Pristosia crenata (Putzeys, 1873)  (China, India, Myanmar, and Nepal)
 Pristosia cupreata (Jedlicka, 1940)  (Taiwan and temperate Asia)
 Pristosia dahud Morvan, 1994  (Nepal)
 Pristosia delavayi (Fairmaire, 1887)  (China)
 Pristosia deqenensis Lassalle, 2010  (China)
 Pristosia dodensis Deuve & Lassalle&Queinnec, 1985  (India)
 Pristosia dongziensis Lassalle, 2013  (China)
 Pristosia elevata Lindroth, 1956  (China)
 Pristosia falsicolor (Fairmaire, 1886)  (China)
 Pristosia flava (Andrewes, 1934)  (India)
 Pristosia glabella J.Schmidt & Hartmann, 2009  (Nepal)
 Pristosia glacialis (Andrewes, 1934)  (India)
 Pristosia hauseri (Jedlicka, 1931)  (China)
 Pristosia heinzi F.Battoni, 1984  (Pakistan)
 Pristosia heyrovskyi (Jedlicka, 1932)  (China)
 Pristosia hweisiensis (Jedlicka, 1937)  (China)
 Pristosia illustris (Andrewes, 1947)  (Myanmar)
 Pristosia impunctata Sasakawa, Kim & Kim&Kubota, 2006  (South Korea)
 Pristosia jedlickai Hovorka & Sciaky, 2003  (China)
 Pristosia jureceki (Jedlicka, 1931)  (China)
 Pristosia lacerans (Bates, 1889)  (India)
 Pristosia lateritia (Fairmaire, 1886)  (China)
 Pristosia lateritioides Lassalle, 2010  (China)
 Pristosia latistoma Sasakawa, Kim & Kim&Kubota, 2006  (South Korea)
 Pristosia ledouxi Deuve & Lassalle&Queinnec, 1985  (India)
 Pristosia leptodes (Andrewes, 1934)  (India)
 Pristosia leurops (Andrewes, 1934)  (India)
 Pristosia litangensis Lassalle, 2010  (China)
 Pristosia macra (Andrewes, 1934)  (India)
 Pristosia magna Lassalle, 2010  (China)
 Pristosia maoniushanensis Lassalle, 2010  (China)
 Pristosia maoxianensis Lassalle, 2010  (China)
 Pristosia meiliensis Lassalle, 2013  (China)
 Pristosia meridionalis Lassalle, 2010  (China)
 Pristosia minutalis (Andrewes, 1934)  (India)
 Pristosia miwai (Jedlicka, 1940)  (Taiwan and temperate Asia)
 Pristosia morvani Lassalle, 2013  (China)
 Pristosia nanpingicus Lassalle, 2010  (China)
 Pristosia nepalensis J.Schmidt & Hartmann, 2009  (Nepal)
 Pristosia nitidula (A.Morawitz, 1862)  (China, Mongolia, and Russia)
 Pristosia nitouensis (Jedlicka, 1937)  (China)
 Pristosia nubilipenissoides Lassalle, 2013  (China)
 Pristosia nubilipennis (Fairmaire, 1889)  (China)
 Pristosia oblonga Lassalle, 2010  (China)
 Pristosia opaca Lassalle, 2010  (China)
 Pristosia picea Motschulsky, 1865  (India)
 Pristosia picescens (Fairmaire, 1887)  (China)
 Pristosia pingwuensis Lassalle, 2013  (China)
 Pristosia potanini (Semenov, 1889)  (China)
 Pristosia prenta (Jedlicka, 1937)  (China)
 Pristosia proxima (A.Morawitz, 1862)  (China, North Korea, Russia, and South Korea)
 Pristosia przewalskii (Semenov, 1889)  (China)
 Pristosia purkynei (Jedlicka, 1931)  (China)
 Pristosia purpurea Lassalle, 2010  (China)
 Pristosia qiaojiacensis Lassalle, 2013  (China)
 Pristosia quadricolor (Andrewes, 1934)  (India)
 Pristosia reitteri (Jedlicka, 1937)  (China)
 Pristosia schnelli Lassalle, 2010  (China)
 Pristosia sciakyi Lassalle, 2010  (China)
 Pristosia sienla (Jedlicka, 1937)  (China)
 Pristosia silvanoi F.Battoni, 1982  (Pakistan)
 Pristosia similata J.Schmidt & Hartmann, 2009  (Nepal)
 Pristosia sterbai (Jedlicka, 1937)  (China)
 Pristosia striata Lassalle, 2010  (China)
 Pristosia strigipennis (Fairmaire, 1889)  (China)
 Pristosia suensoni Lindroth, 1956  (China)
 Pristosia sulcipennis (Fairmaire, 1889)  (China)
 Pristosia szekessyi (Jedlicka, 1960)  (China)
 Pristosia szetschuana (Jedlicka, 1932)  (China)
 Pristosia taibaishanensis Lassalle, 2013  (China)
 Pristosia tenuistriata (Fairmaire, 1889)  (China)
 Pristosia thilliezi Lassalle, 2013  (China)
 Pristosia tibetana (Andrewes, 1934)  (China)
 Pristosia vigil (Tschitscherine, 1895)  (North Korea and Russia)
 Pristosia viridis (Jedlicka, 1940)  (Taiwan and temperate Asia)
 Pristosia wenxianensis Lassalle, 2010  (China)
 Pristosia wrasei Lassalle, 2013  (China)
 Pristosia wrzecionkoi Lassalle, 2010  (China)
 Pristosia xanthopus (Andrewes, 1934)  (Pakistan)
 Pristosia yunnana (Jedlicka, 1931)  (China)
 Pristosia zheduoensis Lassalle, 2013  (China)

References

Platyninae